Jedburgh Grammar School is a state secondary school in Jedburgh, Scotland, with around 440 pupils, 40 teaching staff, and 15 non-teaching staff.

History
While the first institution bearing the name Jedburgh Grammar School was founded in the 15th century by William Turnbull of Bedrule who was then Bishop of Glasgow and the school was based at Jedburgh Abbey where the pupils (boys) would sing and learn about music. In 1747 the school was still based in the crypts of the abbey. This school was created as a result of the Education (Scotland) Act of 1872 which required that children should receive an education. The school was extended at the turn of the century when secondary education was also offered.

Architecture

The school is made up of five main buildings.  The original buildings at this site were started in 1882 to designs by Hardy & Wight and are dated to 1885, whilst the Rutherford and Sports Centre buildings date from the 1970s.  The 1880 part of the school was "listed" in 1993. Since the 1990s, a series of refurbishments have taken place.
Ramps were added to the Brewster, Drama and Social Dining Building in 2013.

In July 2022 Jedburgh Grammar Campus was shortlisted for the RIAS Andrew Doolan Best Building in Scotland Award.

Houses
Pupils of the school belong to one of three Houses named after famous alumni: The most notable person from Jedburgh (Mary Somerville) was a woman and could not attend the school.
 Brewster  (Blue, named after physicist Sir David Brewster)
 Rutherford  (Red, named after theologian Samuel Rutherford)
 Thomson  (Green, named after poet James Thomson)

Notable alumni

John Ainslie, cartographer
Gary Armstrong, rugby union player
Anthony Fasson GC, naval officer
Karen Gillon, MSP

Ainslie Henderson, singer-songwriter
Steve Hislop, motorcycle racer
Bob Keiller, business man
Greig Laidlaw, rugby union player
Roy Laidlaw, rugby union player
The Rt. Hon. Michael Moore MP, Secretary of State for Scotland.
Douglas Young, heavyweight boxer

References

External links
Jedburgh Grammar School
Jedburgh Grammar School's page on Scottish Schools Online
http://www.thesouthernreporter.co.uk/news/boxer-doug-one-of-our-best-1-2340244

Secondary schools in the Scottish Borders
Educational institutions established in the 1870s
Jedburgh